The 2013–14 Liga IV was the 72nd season of the Liga IV, the fourth tier of the Romanian football league system. The champions of each county association play against one from a neighboring county in a play-off match played on a neutral venue. The winners of the play-off matches promoted to Liga III.

Promotion play-off
The matches was scheduled to be played on 21 June 2014.

|}

County leagues

Alba County

Arad County

Argeș County

Bacău County

Bihor County

Bistrița-Năsăud County

Botoșani County

Brașov County

Brăila County

Championship play-off  
The teams started the play-off with only the records achieved in the regular season against the other qualified teams.

Championship play-out  
The teams started the play-out with only the records achieved in the regular season against the other qualified teams.

Bucharest

Regular season

Seria 1

Seria 2

Championship play-off

Group 1 
All matches were played at Romprim Stadium in Bucharest.

Group 2 
All matches were played at Florea Dumitrache Stadium in Bucharest.

Semi-finals

Final 

Comprest GIM București won the 2013–14 Liga IV Bucharest and qualify to promotion play-off in Liga III.

Buzău County

Călărași County

Relegation play-off

Caraș-Severin County

Cluj County

Constanța County

East Series

West Series

Championship play-off  
The teams from the West series started the play-off with all the records achieved in the regular season and the teams from East series started the play-off without the results against Aurora 23 August. The reason is the difference of matches played between the two series, 20 in the East and 18 in the West. The teams played only against the teams from the other series.

Championship play-out  
The teams started the play-out with all the records achieved in the regular season and played only against the teams from the other series.

Covasna County

Dâmbovița County

Dolj County

Regular season

Championship play-off  
The results between the qualified teams was maintained in the championship play-off.

Galați County

Giurgiu County

South Series

North Series

Championship play-off  
The championship play-off played between the best two ranked teams in each series of the regular season. All matches were played at Comunal Stadium in Izvoarele on 31 May and 1 June 2014 the semi-finals and on 4 June 2014 the final.

Semi-finals

Final 

Petrolul Roata Cartojani won the 2013–14 Liga IV Giurgiu County and qualify to promotion play-off in Liga III.

Gorj County

Harghita County

Hunedoara County

Ialomița County

Iași County

Ilfov County

Championship play-off  
Championship play-off played in a single round-robin tournament between the best four teams of the regular season. The teams started the play-off with the following points: 1st place – 3 points, 2nd place – 2 points, 3rd place – 1 point, 4th place – 0 points.

Maramureș County

North Series

South Series

Championship final  
The championship final was played on 5 June 2014 at Viorel Mateianu Stadium in Baia Mare.

Sighetu Marmației won the 2013–14 Liga IV Maramureș County and qualify to promotion play-off in Liga III.

Mehedinți County

Mureș County

Neamț County

Championship play-off  
Championship play-off played in a single round-robin tournament between the best four teams of the regular season. The teams started the play-off with the following points: 1st place – 3 points, 2nd place – 2 points, 3rd place – 1 point, 4th place – 0 points.

All matches were played at Constantinescu Nehoi Stadium from Roman.

Olt County

Prahova County

Satu Mare County

Seria A

Seria B

Championship final  
The championship final was played on 7 June 2014 at Olimpia Stadium in Satu Mare.

Someșul Oar won the 2013–14 Liga IV Satu Mare County and qualify to promotion play-off in Liga III.

 Sălaj County 

 Sibiu County 

 Suceava County 

 Teleorman County 

 Timiș County 

 Tulcea County 

 Championship play-off  
 Semi-finals 

|}
 Final Delta Dobrogea Tulcea won the 2013–14 Liga IV Tulcea County and qualify to promotion play-off in Liga III. Vaslui County 
 Seria 1 

 Seria 2

 Championship play-off  

 Vâlcea County 
 North Series 

 South Series 

 Championship play-off  
 Semi-finals 

 Final Flacăra Horezu won the 2013–14 Liga IV Vâlcea County and qualify to promotion play-off in Liga III.''

Vrancea County

Relegation play-off  
The 10th-placed team of the Liga IV faces the 3rd placed team from Liga V Vrancea County.

See also 
 2013–14 Liga I
 2013–14 Liga II
 2013–14 Liga III

References

External links
 FRF

Liga IV seasons
4
Romania